Tyriozela porphyrogona is a moth of the Heliozelidae family. It was described by Edward Meyrick in 1931. It is found in Japan and Russia.

The wingspan is 8-8.5 mm.

References

Moths described in 1931
Heliozelidae
Moths of Japan